Payyoli railway station (code: PYOL) is a railway station in Kozhikode district, Kerala and falls under the Palakkad railway division of the Southern Railway zone, Indian Railways.

Railway stations in Kozhikode district
Palakkad railway division